Alma Jean Moorhead (born 4 February 1935) is an American retired actress and model. Billed under an alternatively spelled surname, Jean Moorehead, she was Playboy magazine's Playmate of the Month for the October 1955 issue. Her centerfold was photographed by Hal Adams.

Biography 
A former Miss Hollywood, Moorhead acted in movies such as the Ed Wood-scripted The Violent Years (1956) and a guest spot on the TV Western Death Valley Days (one episode, 1957). Her last billed performances were in two low-budget 1959 films, Gunmen from Laredo and The Atomic Submarine, with one more (unbilled) appearance in the 1960 Metro-Goldwyn-Mayer musical Bells Are Ringing.

In the 1960's, she married Theodore Polos and had two children.

References

External links

 Glamour Girls of the Silver Screen

1950s Playboy Playmates
People from Los Angeles
1935 births
Living people